The 1913–14 Illinois Fighting Illini men's basketball team represented the University of Illinois.

Regular season
The 1913–14 University of Illinois Fighting Illini men's basketball team, under the direction of second year coach Ralph Jones, took a step in a positive direction regarding the team's status in the Western Conference. The addition of key players, including future National Player of the Year, Ray Woods, helped guide the Illini to an overall record of nine wins and four losses. The conference record, however, of seven wins and three losses marked, to date, the highest league winning percentage in the history of the university. Unfortunately for the Illini, a scarlet fever scare caused the last two games of the year to be cancelled, including a game at Chicago and at Northwestern. The team finished fourth in the conference with a starting squad of Kircher, Williford, Bane, Crane & Duner would return the following season.

Roster

Source

Schedule
												
Source																

|-	
!colspan=12 style="background:#DF4E38; color:white;"| Non-Conference regular season
|- align="center" bgcolor=""

			

|-	
!colspan=9 style="background:#DF4E38; color:#FFFFFF;"|Big Ten regular season	

				

Bold Italic connotes conference game

Awards and honors
Ray Woods was elected to the "Illini Men's Basketball All-Century Team" in 2004.

References

Illinois Fighting Illini
Illinois Fighting Illini men's basketball seasons
1913 in sports in Illinois
1914 in sports in Illinois